Henry Stanley Monck, 1st Earl of Rathdowne and 2nd Viscount Monck (26 July 1785 – 20 September 1848), was the son of Charles Monck, 1st Viscount Monck, and Anne Quin. On 28 July 1806, he married Lady Frances Mary Trench, daughter of William Trench, 1st Earl of Clancarty, and his wife Anne, Countess of Clancarty (née Gardiner). They had 11 daughters.
Lady Anne Florinda Monck (died 1876) married William Mulveney
Lady Elizabeth Louise Mary Monck (died 16 June 1892), married her first cousin Charles Monck, 4th Viscount Monck
Lady Emily Monck (died 22 November 1837), married William Barlow Smyth
Lady Frances Isabella Monck (died 9 June 1871), married Owen Blayney Cole
Lady Georgiana Ellen Monck (died 20 March 1887), married Edward Croker

As he died without male heirs, the earldom became extinct and the viscountcy was inherited by his brother Charles.

References 
thepeerage Accessed 9 June 2008.
Kelly's Handbook to the Titled, Landed & Official Classes. London: Kelly and Company, 1882 (p. 581). googlebooks Retrieved 9 June 2008.

1785 births
1848 deaths
Earls in the Peerage of Ireland